Lepraliellidae is a family of bryozoans belonging to the order Cheilostomatida.

Genera

Genera:
 Acanthophragma Hayward, 1993
 Balantiostoma Marsson, 1887
 Celleporaria Lamouroux, 1821

References

Cheilostomatida